This List of mountains and hills of the Saarland shows a selection of mountains and hills in the German federal state of the Saarland and is listed by descending height in metres above sea level (NHN).

Name, Height, Location (nearby settlement)
 Dollberg (695.4 m), north of Nonnweiler, Dollberge; Saarland/Rhineland-Palatinate border
 Schimmelkopf (694.8 m), north of Weiskirchen, Schwarzwälder Hochwald; Saarland/Rhineland-Palatinate border
 Trautzberg (c. 604 m), east of Freisen Saarland/Rhineland-Palatinate border
 Hellerberg (596.3 m), east of Freisen
 Füsselberg (595.1 m), south of Freisen
 Peterberg (c. 584 m), south of Braunshausen
 Weiselberg (569.5 m), west of Oberkirchen, North Palatine Uplands
 Schaumberg (c. 569 m), northwest of Tholey, Prims-Blies Hills
 Schankelberg (c. 550 m), north of Nonnweiler
 Sparrenberg (c. 544 m) north of Freisen
 Diegelsberg (537.2 m), southwest of Bosen
 Felsenberg (c. 537 m), north of Wadrill, Black Forest Highlands
 Schreck (c. 535 m), south of Nonnweiler
 Höcherberg (c. 518 m), north of Höchen, North Palatine Uplands
 Judenkopf (c. 517 m), north-northwest of Britten
 Losenberg (512.5 m), northwest of Oberthal
 Leißberg (512.4 m), north of Oberthal
 Heidenkopf (507.8 m), south of Nohfelden
 Momberg (499.4 m), northwest of Oberthal
 Trausberg (c. 499 m), north of Dautweiler
 Bosenberg (485.2 m), east-northeast of St. Wendel
 Buberg (465.8 m), northeast of Bubach
 Göttelborner Höhe (443.2 m), west-southwest of Göttelborn
 Kewelsberg (441.8 m), south-southwest of Tünsdorf
 Kehrberg (438.7 m), west of Marth
 Litermont (414.2 m), north of Nalbach
 Leuker Kopf (c. 414 m), northwest of Keuchingen
 Hoxberg (413.6 m), southwest of Lebach
 Monte Schlacko (403.5 m), east of Püttlingen
 Betzentaler Berg (402.3 m), south of Sankt Ingbert
 Spiemont (c. 402 m), north of Niederlinxweiler, North Palatine Uplands
 Galgenberg (401.1 m), south of Losheim
 Großer Kahlenberg (401.1 m), west-northwest of Böckweiler
 Großer Stiefel (397.2 m), west of Sengscheid
 Hungerkopf (c. 396 m), northeast of Mettlach
 Hölschberg (394.8 m), east-northeast of Erfweiler-Ehlingen
 Totenkopf (387.0 m), east of Niedergailbach, Bliesgau
 Alteberg (385.1 m), east of Büdingen
 Einöder Höhe (c. 382 m), east of Einöd
 Hirschberg (380.6 m), east of Kirkel
 Sauberg (377.3 m), west of Altforweiler
 Hoher Kopf (377.1 m), northeast of Kirkel
 Schwarzenberg (c. 377 m), west of Saarbrücken-Scheidt
 Gipsberg (c. 373 m), northwest of Merchingen
 Kahlenberg (372.0 m), southeast of St. Ingbert, Sankt Ingbert-Kirkel Forest Region
 Klosterberg (370.0 m), northeast of Bierbach, Sankt Ingbert-Kirkel Forest Region
 Karlsberg (c. 366 m), east-northeast of Sanddorf
 Wickersberg (361.4 m), west of Saarbrücken-Ensheim
 Brennender Berg (c. 360 m), west of Saarbrücken-Dudweiler
  Schlossberg (Homburg) (c. 325 m), east of the old town of Homburg
 Schlossberg (Kirkel) (c. 307 m), in the centre of Kirkel
 Winterberg (300.9 m), east-southeast of the city centre of Saarbrücken
 Halberg (266.0 m), southeast of the city of Saarbrücken
 Kaninchenberg (265.4 m), east-southeast of the city centre of Saarbrücken

See also 
 List of the highest mountains in Germany
 List of the highest mountains in the German states
 List of mountain and hill ranges in Germany

!
Saarland